Jungle Princess is a Bollywood film. It was released in 1942.

Cast
 Fearless Nadia
 John Cawas  
 Radha Rani
 Baby Madhuri 
 Shehzadi

References

External links
 
 Jungle Princess on indiancine.ma
 Jungle Princess, part 1, Jungle Princess, part 2 on YouTube

1942 films
1940s Hindi-language films
Films directed by Homi Wadia
Indian black-and-white films